The 23rd Street station was an express station on the demolished IRT Third Avenue Line in Manhattan, New York City. It had two levels. The lower level was served by local trains and had two tracks and two side platforms. It was built first. The upper level was built as part of the Dual Contracts and had one track with two side platforms and served express trains. This station closed on May 12, 1955, with the ending of all service on the Third Avenue El south of 149th Street.

References

External links
 

IRT Third Avenue Line stations
Railway stations in the United States opened in 1878
Railway stations closed in 1955
1878 establishments in New York (state)
1955 disestablishments in New York (state)
Former elevated and subway stations in Manhattan

Third Avenue
23rd Street (Manhattan)